Prahran is an electoral district of the Legislative Assembly in the Australian state of Victoria. It was created by the Electoral Act Amendment Act 1888, taking effect at the 1889 elections. 
The electorate is the state’s smallest by area, covering a little under 11 km² in the inner south-east of Melbourne. It includes the suburbs of South Yarra, Prahran and Windsor, as well as parts of Balaclava, St Kilda, St Kilda East and Toorak (west of Orrong Rd).

Prahran has tended to be a marginal seat throughout its existence, repeatedly changing between the Labor Party and its successive conservative rivals. It has not, however, been a bellwether seat, as the changes of party control have often not coincided with changes of government. Since the 1980s, the electorate has become gradually more conservative as a result of increasing gentrification in the inner suburbs, resulting in seventeen years of Liberal control from 1985 until 2002. This trend was broken in the 2002 election, which saw popular local member and shadow minister Leonie Burke defeated by Labor rising star Tony Lupton on an unexpectedly large swing.

The seat was strongly targeted by the Liberal Party during the 2006 election, with high-profile barrister Clem Newton-Brown narrowly preselected as their candidate after a tight contest. Though Newton-Brown ran a thorough campaign, he was not successful. Following his success in the 2006 election, Tony Lupton was promoted to the position of Parliamentary Secretary for Industry and Innovation. Newton-Brown stood again at the 2010 election and was this time successful. He contested the 2014 election but lost to Sam Hibbins of the Greens. Along with the seat of Melbourne it was the first win for the Greens in the Victorian Legislative Assembly.

At the 2022 election, a large swing to the Greens saw them take first place on primary votes before comfortably defeating the Liberal Party on a 2-candidate-preferred basis, retaining the seat for a third term.

List of members for Prahran

Election results

External links
 District profile from the Victorian Electoral Commission

References

Electoral districts of Victoria (Australia)
1889 establishments in Australia
City of Melbourne
City of Stonnington
City of Port Phillip
St Kilda East, Victoria
St Kilda, Victoria
Electoral districts and divisions of Greater Melbourne